Maculonaclia tampoketsya is a moth of the  subfamily Arctiinae. It is found in the central Madagascar.

This species has a wingspan of 22mm. It has narrow, allongated forewings of darf brown colour with 5 straw-yellow spots. The genitalia of this species are close to Maculonaclia ankasoka. The holotype provides from the region of Ankazobe.

References

Moths described in 1969
Arctiinae
Moths of Madagascar
Moths of Africa